Fresna netopha, the common Acraea skipper, is a species of butterfly in the family Hesperiidae. It is found in Guinea, Sierra Leone, Liberia, Ivory Coast, Ghana, Togo, Nigeria, Cameroon, Gabon, the Republic of the Congo, the Central African Republic, the Democratic Republic of the Congo, Uganda, Rwanda, Burundi, western Kenya, Tanzania and north-eastern Zambia. The habitat consists of drier, open forests and the transitional zone between forests and Guinea savanna.

Adults are attracted to flowers.

The larvae feed on Afrormosia laxiflora.

References

Butterflies described in 1878
Astictopterini
Butterflies of Africa
Taxa named by William Chapman Hewitson